Henry I of Cyprus, nicknamed the Fat (3 May 1217 – 18 January 1253 at Nicosia) was King of Cyprus from 1218 to 1253. He was the son of Hugh I of Cyprus and Alice of Champagne. When his father Hugh I died on January 10, 1218, the 8-month-old Henry became king. His mother was the official regent, but handed off the actual governing to her uncle, Philip of Ibelin.  When Philip died, the effective regency passed to his brother, John of Ibelin, the Old Lord of Beirut.

Biography

Henry was crowned at the age of 8 at Santa Sophia, Nicosia, in 1225. The reason for the early coronation was as a political maneuver by his uncle Philip, who sensed that Frederick II, Holy Roman Emperor, was going to attempt to seize power.  In 1228 this did occur, as Frederick forced John of Ibelin to hand over the regency to Amalric Barlais, and the island of Cyprus.  However, when Frederick left the island in April, John counter-attacked and regained control, which began the War of the Lombards. Henry was able to assume control of the kingdom when he came of age at 15, in 1232, and maintained close ties with the Ibelin family.

Henry himself served as Regent of Jerusalem for Conrad of Hohenstaufen 1246–1253.

He was married three times; his third wife, whom he married in 1250, was Plaisance of Antioch, daughter of Bohemund V of Antioch. They had a son, Hugh.

On his death, Henry was succeeded by his only child, his infant son Hugh II (b. 1253). If he had not had children, his heirs were his eldest sister's sons Jean de Brienne (b. 1234) and Hugh of Brienne (b. c. 1240), as well as his younger sister's son Hugh of Antioch, the future Hugh III of Cyprus (b. c. 1235). He was buried at the Church of the Templars, at Nicosia.

Consorts:
 Alix of Montferrat (1210/1215 – Kyrenia, December, 1232 – May, 1233, buried at Santa Sophia, Nicosia), daughter of Marquis William VI of Montferrat, by Bertha da Clavesana, married at Limassol in May, 1229, without issue
 Stephanie of Lampron (ca. 1220/1225 – soon after April 1, 1249, buried at Santa Sophia, Nicosia), daughter of Constantine of Lampron, Regent of Armenia, by Stephanie of Barbaron, married at Nicosia in 1237/1238, without issue
 Plaisance of Antioch (1235 – September 22/27, 1261), daughter of Bohemond V, Prince of Antioch and Count of Tripoli, by Lucienne of Segni, married at Santa Sophia, Nicosia, in 1250, and had issue, an only son: Hugh II of Cyprus.

References

1217 births
1253 deaths
13th-century Cypriot people
13th-century people of the Kingdom of Jerusalem
13th-century monarchs in the Middle East
13th-century viceregal rulers
Kings of Cyprus
Medieval child monarchs
Christians of the Sixth Crusade
Regents of Jerusalem